Black River and Western Railroad (Great Western) No. 60 is a 2-8-0 "Consolidation" type steam locomotive built in August 1937 by the American Locomotive Company (ALCO) in Schenectady, New York. It currently operates on the Black River and Western Railroad (BR&W) in Ringoes, New Jersey It was one of two operating Great Western steam locomotives with No. 90 being the other one.

History
No. 60 originally operated on the Great Western Railroad (GW) in Colorado where it pulled sugar beet and molasses trains. During World War II, a smokebox extension was added to allow the use of poor quality coal because of war-time restrictions. In 1963, No. 60 was purchased by the newly formed short line Black River and Western Railroad for tourist excursion service. It pulled the first train out of Flemington in May 1965. 

During its tenure running on the Black River & Western, 60 has undergone several cosmetic changes through the years. The current paint scheme resembles a mid-sized freight locomotive, with a graphite smokebox and black drivers.  

While No. 60 was bought by the Black River & Western in 1963, it has ventured off the railroad several times. In 1967, the locomotive ran excursions on the Long Island Railroad out of Jamaica, New York. It is rumored that she reached a speed of 55MPH with a 14-car long train during these trips. 60 also visited the Whippany Railway Museum in 1994 for a railroad festival alongside Susquehanna Railway's SY 2-8-2 No. 142. 

The locomotive was used as the primary motive power for the railroad when in service. The locomotive was taken out of service in November 2000 for a mandatory 1,472-inspection required by the Federal Railroad Administration (FRA) which took almost 12 years to complete. The locomotive returned to service in August 2012. The locomotive is still operational as of 2022.

References

 
 
 

2-8-0 locomotives
Individual locomotives of the United States
ALCO locomotives
Railway locomotives introduced in 1937
Standard gauge locomotives of the United States

Preserved steam locomotives of New Jersey